Dłużec may refer to the following places in Poland:
Dłużec, Lower Silesian Voivodeship (south-west Poland)
Dłużec, Lesser Poland Voivodeship (south Poland)
Dłużec, Mrągowo County in Warmian-Masurian Voivodeship (north Poland)
Dłużec, Węgorzewo County in Warmian-Masurian Voivodeship (north Poland)